John McConnell may refer to:

Business
 John Wilson McConnell (1877–1963), Canadian businessman, newspaper publisher, and philanthropist
 John H. McConnell (1923–2008), industrialist, philanthropist, and founder of the Columbus Blue Jackets
 John P. McConnell (businessman), CEO of Worthington Industries

Politics
 John E. McConnell (1863–1928), Wisconsin State Assemblyman
 John Henry McConnell (1860–1944), Canadian politician and member of the Manitoba Liberal Party
 John McConnell (Quebec politician) (1799–?), political figure in Canada East
 John R. McConnell (1826–1879), California attorney general

Other
 J. C. McConnell (1844–1904), American scientific illustrator
 John McConnell (footballer, born 1881), Scottish footballer (Grimsby Town FC)
 John McConnell (footballer, born 1885), Scottish footballer (Liverpool FC)
 John P. McConnell (general) (1908–1986), U.S. Air Force Chief of Staff and general
 John McConnell (peace activist) (1915–2012), peace activist and creator of Earth Day
 Mike McConnell (U.S. Naval officer) (John Michael McConnell, born 1943), former director of the NSA and recent U.S. Director of National Intelligence
 John J. McConnell Jr. (born 1958), judge on the U.S. District Court for the District of Rhode Island
 John McConnell (actor) (born 1958), actor and radio host
 John Preston McConnell ( early 20th century), American academic
 John W. McConnell (academician), American college president